State Highway 71 (SH 71) or Tirur - Malappuram - Manjeri road is a State Highway in Kerala, India that starts in Tirur passing through Kottakkal , Malappuram and ends in Manjeri. The highway is 39.0 km long.

The Route Map 
Tirur - Edarikode - Kottakkal - Puthur - Mannoor - Vadakkamanna - Malappuram - Irumbuzhi - Panayi - Manjeri

See also 
Roads in Kerala
List of State Highways in Kerala

References 

State Highways in Kerala
Roads in Malappuram district